Golam Kibria (born 28 August 1989) is a Bangladeshi cricketer. He played one first-class match for Barisal Division in 2010. He was part of Bangladesh's squad for the 2008 Under-19 Cricket World Cup.

References

External links
 

1989 births
Living people
Bangladeshi cricketers
Barisal Division cricketers
People from Barisal